The Agusta A.115 (registration I-AGUC) was a prototype helicopter flown in 1961 in Italy. It was essentially a Bell 47J-3 with an unclad, tubular tail boom, and powered by a Turbomeca Astazou II turboshaft engine. No production ensued.

Specifications

See also

References

 
 
 

Agusta aircraft
1970s Italian civil utility aircraft
1960s Italian helicopters
Aircraft first flown in 1961